Great Lakes Health System is a healthcare system for Western New York and it includes Kaleida Health, the State University of New York at Buffalo, Erie County Medical Center and physicians throughout the community. It was primarily created as a result of the merger between Kaleida Health and the Erie County Medical Center.

External links 

Call it Great Lakes Health System of WNY. Buffalo Business First, 2008

Non-profit organizations based in New York (state)